Regular Lovers is a 2005 French coming-of-age romantic drama film directed by Philippe Garrel and starring Louis Garrel and Clotilde Hesme. Set in 1968, it tells the story of a young couple. The film had its world premiere in the Competition section of the 62nd Venice International Film Festival on 3 September 2005. It was released in France on 26 October 2005.

Plot
In 1968, François (Louis Garrel) joins the civil unrest in Paris with his friends. After the unrest dies down, he and his friends retreat to a mansion and enjoy a period of hedonism, in stark contrast to their time at the barricades. François meets Lilie and falls in love with her.

Cast

Release
The film had its world premiere in the Competition section of the 62nd Venice International Film Festival on 3 September 2005. It was released in France on 26 October 2005.

Reception

Critical response
On review aggregator website Rotten Tomatoes, the film holds an approval rating of 82% based on 17 reviews, and an average rating of 6.7/10. On Metacritic, the film has a weighted average score of 76 out of 100, based on 7 critics, indicating "generally favorable reviews".

Peter Bradshaw of The Guardian gave the film 3 out of 5 stars, saying: "The violence and inarticulate idealism, and the disappointments and frustrations of youth, are still swirling around in Philippe Garrel's head, and he transfers them, almost unedited, on to the cinema screen." Jesse Paddock of Slant Magazine called it "a wonderful tribute to the ideals of youth." The New York Times called it a Critic's Pick at its 2007 limited theatrical release and called it a "magnificent" "tender portrait of late-1960s French youth."

The New Yorker's Richard Brody included the film as number 5 on his list of "Best of the Decade" for the 2000s.

Accolades

References

External links
 
 

2005 films
2005 independent films
2005 romantic drama films
2000s coming-of-age drama films
2000s French-language films
Arte France Cinéma films
Coming-of-age romance films
European Film Awards winners (films)
Films about couples
Films about drugs
Films directed by Philippe Garrel
Films set in 1968
Films whose director won the Best Director Lumières Award
French black-and-white films
French coming-of-age drama films
French independent films
French romantic drama films
Louis Delluc Prize winners
2000s French films